Montreuil-le-Gast (Gallo: Montroelh-le-Gast) is a commune in the Ille-et-Vilaine department of Brittany in northwestern France.

Population
Inhabitants of Montreuil-le-Gast are called in French montreuillais.

See also
Communes of the Ille-et-Vilaine department

References

External links

Official website 
Mayors of Ille-et-Vilaine Association 

Communes of Ille-et-Vilaine